Henning Astrup may refer to:

 Henning Astrup, born in 1864, Norwegian architect
 Henning Thorvaldssøn Astrup, born in 1904, Norwegian architect